Credit Karma is an American multinational personal finance company founded in 2007, which has been a brand of Intuit since December 2020.  It is best known as a free credit and financial management platform, but its features also include monitoring of unclaimed property databases and a tool to identify and dispute credit report errors. The company operates in the United States, Canada and the United Kingdom.

All of Credit Karma’s services are free to consumers. Revenue from targeted advertisements for financial products offsets the costs of its free products and services. Credit Karma earns revenue from lenders, who pay the company when Credit Karma successfully recommends customers to the lenders.

History 
Kenneth Lin, who previously founded Multilytics Marketing and worked with E-Loan and Upromise, launched Credit Karma in 2007 with co-founders Ryan Graciano and Nichole Mustard. The website went live in February 2008. Early investors included Chris Larson, CEO of Prosper, and Mark Lefanowicz, former president of E-Loan.

In November 2009, Credit Karma closed a $2.5 million Series A funding round led by QED Investors with participation from SV Angel, Felicis Ventures and Founders Fund. In 2013, Credit Karma secured $30 million in Series B funding led by Ribbit Capital and Susquehanna Growth Equity. 

In March 2014, Credit Karma raised  $85 million in Series C financing, led by CapitalG with participation from Tiger Global Management and existing investors. The company followed that with $75 million in follow on funding in September 2014 from CapitalG, Tiger Global Management and Susquehanna Growth Equity.

In December 2015, Credit Karma acquired mobile notifications app developer Snowball for an undisclosed amount. As of 2015, Credit Karma had raised $368.5 million in financing, at a valuation of $3.5 billion.

In 2016, Credit Karma acquired money reclamation service Claimdog. In December 2016, Credit Karma acquired AFJC Corporation, owner of OnePriceTaxes.com, to accelerate its entry into the tax preparation market.  Related to the launch of tax preparation services, the company increased its workforce and opened offices in Los Angeles and Charlotte, North Carolina.

In May 2017, Credit Karma launched Unclaimed Money in seven US states. The product aims to help users find unclaimed money, such as unclaimed refunds and insurance payouts.

In March 2018, Credit Karma acquired personal finance company Penny for an undisclosed amount. In August, it acquired mortgage platform Approved for an undisclosed amount.

In May 2019, the customers of the Noddle credit reporting service in the United Kingdom were acquired from TransUnion.

In December 2020, Intuit acquired Credit Karma for approximately $7.1 billion. The acquisition was initially delayed due to a DOJ antitrust lawsuit but it was finally approved after the company agreed to divest its free tax preparation service, known as Credit Karma Tax, which was a direct competitor to Intuit's TurboTax product. 

That same month, Credit Karma announced that it was moving its headquarters across San Francisco Bay from San Francisco to Oakland. 

In August 2021, Credit Karma reached an agreement with NBA franchise Houston Rockets to have the company’s name appear on the team’s jersey’s beginning in the 2021 season.

In September 2022, the Federal Trade Commission (FTC) ordered Credit Karma to pay its users $3million for "false claims" that impacted their credit scores. Nearly one-thirds of pre-approved users who applied for credit cards were eventually denied following a credit check, costing their time and a negative impact to their credit score. Credit Karma reached a settlement with the FTC, and stated that the company is paid only when users are approved for products like credit cards.

Products and services 
Credit Karma provides free credit scores and credit reports in the United States, Canada and United Kingdom from national credit bureaus TransUnion and Equifax, alongside daily credit monitoring from TransUnion.

Credit Karma also provides identity theft protection and credit tools, such as a Credit Score Simulator which simulates the effect of potential financial actions on a user's credit score; and tailored recommendations for credit cards and personal loans.

Credit Karma Tax, its free United States tax filing service, was announced in December 2016. Credit Karma Tax does not participate in the Free File Alliance, and so is not bound by its requirements to restrict eligibility for free filing. The company's primary competitors in this area are TaxAct, TurboTax and H&R Block. In November 2020, Square, Inc. announced it was acquiring Credit Karma Tax for $50 million and would make it a part of its Cash App unit.

See also 
 Credit score in the United States
 Comparison of free credit monitoring services

References

External links 
 

Intuit
Companies based in Oakland, California
Online financial services companies of the United States
American companies established in 2007
Financial services companies established in 2007
Internet properties established in 2007
2020 mergers and acquisitions
Financial services companies based in California
Credit scoring
Finance websites
500 Startups companies
Tax software of the United States
Tax preparation companies of the United States
2007 establishments in California